When We Left Earth: The NASA Missions (or NASA's Greatest Missions: When We Left Earth in the UK) is a 2008 Discovery Channel HD documentary miniseries consisting of six episodes documenting American human spaceflight from the first Mercury flights and the Gemini program, to the Apollo program and its Moon missions and landings, to the Space Shuttle missions and the construction of the International Space Station.

The miniseries was created in association with NASA to commemorate the agency's fiftieth anniversary in 2008. It first aired on June 8, and concluded on June 22. Each airing consisted of two hour-long episodes. The miniseries was then released on DVD on July 10, 2008, and released on Blu-ray disc on August 12.

Production

Development
Discovery partnered with NASA in September 2007 to create the series. The Discovery team went through 500 hours of archived film and selected 150 hours of it to be transferred to high definition. Discovery donated the high definition film back to NASA. The airing of the miniseries was timed to coincide with NASA's 50th anniversary.

Executive producers and showrunners
The miniseries features interviews from Mercury, Gemini, Apollo, and Space Shuttle astronauts including John Glenn and Neil Armstrong, as well as NASA officials including flight directors Chris Kraft, Gene Kranz, and Glynn Lunney, former president George H. W. Bush and long-time NBC space journalist Jay Barbree.

The series was narrated by actor Gary Sinise, who played astronaut Ken Mattingly in the 1995 film Apollo 13. It was executive produced by Richard Dale and Bill Howard and edited by Peter Parnham and Simon Holland.

One purpose of the series was to tell the space race story to the under 40 generation, which did not experience it firsthand.

Music
The score was composed by Richard Blair-Oliphant and conducted by Benjamin Wallfisch (Atonement 2007, The Soloist 2009). Music and sound were nominated for a 2009 News and Documentary Emmy Award for Outstanding Individual Achievement in Music and Sound.

Episodes

Release

The first two installments of When We Left Earth originally premiered on Discovery Channel June 8, 2008. Two more episodes were played on the following two Sundays. The miniseries was released on DVD on July 10, 2008, and was released on Blu-ray disc on August 12.

The third episode, "Landing the Eagle", was re-aired on July 20, 2009 for the 40th anniversary of the Apollo 11 Moon landing. The first episode was re-aired December 11, 2016 in honor of John Glenn, who died December 8, 2016.

Reception

The astronauts involved with the film believed the high definition version of the footage helped capture what they really saw. Astronaut Charlie Duke said, "[It] captures what we see and what we felt and what we experienced, the reality, the vividness, the emotional side of it." Cary Darling of Herald and Review said that the miniseries is less about NASA's setbacks, and more about a "great-to-look-at, old-fashioned hero worship of those who dare to reach for the heavens." High-Def Digest said this documentary was special because of its focus on human elements instead of scientific milestones, but wished it could have focused on efforts by other countries as well.

See also
 Space Race (TV series)
 Rocket Science (miniseries)
 Apollo 11 in popular culture

References

External links
 
 When We Left Earth: The NASA Missions on Discovery

Discovery Channel original programming
Television series about the Apollo program
2008 American television series debuts
Documentary films about the space program of the United States
2008 American television series endings
Films about astronauts
Films about the Apollo program